"Sweet Loving Man" is a song by Brazilian singer Morris Albert.  It was the follow-up to his international hit song, "Feelings" from his 1975 LP of the same name.

During the winter of 1976, "Sweet Loving Man" peaked at number 93 on the Billboard Hot 100 and number 15 on the Adult Contemporary chart in the United States.  It also charted very similarly in Canada.

Chart history

References

External links
 Lyrics of this song
 

1975 songs
1975 singles
Morris Albert songs
RCA Victor singles
Rock ballads
1970s ballads